Buzz and Tell is a CBeebies programme created and produced by Jon Doyle. It is a comedy puppet panel show following a format that parodies University Challenge. There are five contestants in each episode. Each show includes a "missing word round", a "picture round", a "numbers round" and a "sound round". The winner receives a silly prize; for example, Mr. Biscuits won a wooden spoon in episode 28.

Characters
Different contestants appear in different episodes. Mr Biscuits and Charles Cheese have appeared in every episode alongside Mr Flipstick the quizmaster.

 Walter Flipstick – He is a walrus who is the quizmaster of the show.
 Mr Biscuits – He is a rabbit who likes biscuits
 Orange Bernard – He is an orangutan who is obsessed with bananas. His greatest achievement is the ability to eat a banana sideways.
 Ken Koala – He is a very shy koala with an Australian accent.
 Miss Honkover – She is an exotic bird who likes singing
 Melanie Wiggles – She is a rabbit who studies carrots.
 Karl – He is a chinchilla with a large knowledge of nuts. He regularly forgets to press his buzzer and what he was going to say next.
 Henrietta Peck – She is a chicken who is often joined by one of her eggs hatching into a very deep voiced chick part way through the show. 
 Charles Cheese – He is a mouse with a cheese fascination. He is also the smallest of all of the contestants.
 B1N – He is a rubbish bin robot made from a pedal bin. B1N frequently answers "sausage" to any question.
 Callista Croak – She is a frog who likes to keep fit.

Episodes

  Walter Flipstick swapped places with Orange Bernand for the tie-breaker and got it correct.

References

External links
 
 

2010 British television series debuts
2010 British television series endings
2010s British children's television series
BBC children's television shows
British preschool education television series
British television shows featuring puppetry
CBeebies
English-language television shows
Television series about mice and rats
2010s preschool education television series